Nogra is a genus of flowering plants in the legume family, Fabaceae. It belongs to the subfamily Faboideae.

Kew POWO accepts the following species:
 Nogra dalzellii (Baker) Merr.
 Nogra filicaulis (Kurz) Merr.
 Nogra grahamii (Wall. ex Benth.) Merr.
 Nogra guangxiensis C.F.Wei

The genus is phylogenetically allied with Pueraria.

References

Phaseoleae
Fabaceae genera